Nototriton gamezi is a species of salamander in the family Plethodontidae. It is also known as the Monteverde moss salamander.

It is endemic to Cordillera de Tilarán, Costa Rica.

Its natural habitat is tropical moist montane forests.

Sources

Nototriton
Amphibians described in 2000
Amphibians of Costa Rica
Endemic fauna of Costa Rica
Taxonomy articles created by Polbot